Communications in Algebra is a monthly peer-reviewed scientific journal covering algebra, including commutative algebra, ring theory, module theory, non-associative algebra (including Lie algebras and Jordan algebras), group theory, and algebraic geometry. It was established in 1974 and is published by Taylor & Francis. The editor-in-chief is Scott Chapman (Sam Houston State University). Earl J. Taft (Rutgers University) was the founding editor.

Abstracting and indexing 
The journal is abstracted and indexed in CompuMath Citation Index, Current Contents/Chemical, Earth, and Physical Sciences, Mathematical Reviews, MathSciNet, Science Citation Index Expanded (SCIE), and Zentralblatt MATH. According to the Journal Citation Reports, the journal has a 2018 impact factor of 0.525.

References

External links 
 

Publications established in 1974
Mathematics journals
English-language journals
Monthly journals